Theresa Ann Gregory (born April 30, 1956 in Washington, D.C.) is an American country music singer-songwriter. Gregory's debut album, Just Like Me, was released in 1981 by Handshake Records. Its first single, the title track, reached the Top 20 on the Billboard Hot Country Singles chart.

Dave Mulholland of the Ottawa Citizen gave the album a mixed review, praising Gregory's "light, lilting voice" but criticizing the "mundane lyrics".

Discography

Albums

Singles

References

External links
[ Terry Gregory] at Allmusic

1956 births
American country singer-songwriters
American women country singers
Living people
Scotti Brothers Records artists
21st-century American women
Singer-songwriters from Washington, D.C.